Kamarasu is a 2002 Indian Tamil-language romantic drama film written and directed by P. C. Anbazhagan. It starred Murali, Laila, Vadivelu, Vennira Aadai Nirmala and Srividya. The film was produced by P.S.K. Karunakaran and distributed by R. B. Choudary in the banner of Super Good Films. The music composed by S. A. Rajkumar were a success, however the film was released to negative reviews.

Plot
Kamarasu (Murali) hails from a village and is employed as a driver with an industrialist Latha (Srividya), who treats Kamarasu as her own son. Kamarasu is very affectionate towards his widowed mother (Vennira Aadai Nirmala) and takes care of her. Kamarasu falls in love with Vasanthi (Laila), who also hails from his village. Kamarasu is kind towards everyone and earns the love of the villagers. Unfortunately, Kamarasu's mother passes away, which shatters Kamarasu. However, he comes back to normal with the help of Vasanthi's love and affection. A few days later, Vasanthi also passes away due to a lightning strike, which makes Kamarasu worry a lot. Kamarasu decides to spend the rest of his life serving the needy people as he has lost both his mother and lover. Latha takes care of Kamarasu, and he sees her as his mother. One day, Latha and her daughters meet with an accident and are admitted in a hospital with multiple organ failure. The doctor (Chandrasekhar) informs Kamarasu that Latha needs a heart transplant immediately, while her daughters need other organ transplants such as liver, eyes, etc. Kamarasu requests the doctor to take his organs, thereby saving Latha and her daughters, for which the doctor does not agree. Kamarasu kills himself by jumping out of the window so that his organs can be donated to Latha and her daughters. The doctor performs the transplantations, which saves Latha and her daughters. Knowing this, Latha feels sad but at the same time proud about Kamarasu's sacrifice. The movie ends with a message about organ donations.

Cast 

 Murali as Kamarasu
 Laila as Vasanthi
 Vadivelu as Velu
 Vennira Aadai Nirmala as Kamarasu's mother
 Srividya as Latha
 C. R. Saraswathi as Vasanthi's mother
 Chandrasekhar as Doctor
 Delhi Ganesh as Advocate
 Madhan Bob
 Anu Mohan 
 Bala Singh
 Sanjeev as Rogue
 Singamuthu
 Lavanya
 S. Ve. Shekher as Special appearance in "Pottu Mela"
 Ragasudha as Special appearance in "Pottu Mela"

Production
Director Anbazhagan had proposed the story to Choudary in 1998 during a coincidental meeting on Marina Beach and subsequently impressed him after reading a collection of short poems and stories he had written, before being given the opportunity to narrate a story.

The film was delayed for two years, with Choudary reviving it for release.

Soundtrack
Soundtrack was composed by S. A. Rajkumar. "Paathi Nila" is based on "Ye Swapnalokala" from Suswagatham.

Reception
Malathi Rangarajan of The Hindu wrote "KAMARASU" IS late by at least three decades. Obsolete in concept, characterisation and presentation, a sense of déjà vu sets in very early." Malini Mannath of Chennai Online wrote "With a script of this type, the cast could hardly do much here. There is a lot of unintended humour, some of the shots are repeated over and over, the director seeming to lose track of the characterisation and ambience".

References

2002 films
2000s Tamil-language films
Super Good Films films
Indian drama films
2002 directorial debut films
Films scored by S. A. Rajkumar